Edenta is a village located in the southeastern part of Awo-Idemili, in Imo State, Nigeria. It is an Igbo heartland, where many are struggling to make a better place. Edenta is one of Nigeria's local towns that still maintain their cultures and identities.

Towns in Imo State